Theriogenology is a specialty of veterinary medicine concerned with animal reproduction. This includes the physiology and pathology of male and female reproductive systems of animals and the clinical practice of veterinary obstetrics, gynecology, andrology and assisted reproductive technologies (ART). Theriogenologists are veterinarians with advanced training in animal reproduction like semen analysis, evaluation and processing, breeding soundness,  IVF, embryo transfer and obstetrics.  In the United States, all theriogenologists are board-certified by the American College of Theriogenologists.

See also
Artificial insemination in livestock and pets
Animal sexual behavior

Sources

External links 
 Society for Theriogenology
 American College of Theriogenologists